This is a list of Kazakh football transfers during the 2021 winter transfer window, which runs from 10 January until 24 April 2022. Only clubs of the 2022 Kazakhstan Premier League are included.

Kazakhstan Premier League 2022

Aksu

In:

Out:

Aktobe

In:

Out:

Akzhayik

In:

Out:

Astana

In:

Out:

Atyrau

In:

Out:

Caspiy

In:

Out:

Kairat

In:

Out:

Kyzylzhar

In:

Out:

Maktaaral

In:

Out:

Ordabasy

In:

Out:

Shakhter Karagandy

In:

Out:

Taraz

In:

Out:

Tobol

In:

Out:

Turan

In:

Out:

References

Kazakhstan
2021-22
Transfers